Kyrgyzstan–Tajikistan relations refers to the bilateral diplomatic relations between Kyrgyzstan and Tajikistan. Both countries were a part of the Soviet Union. Kyrgyzstan–Tajikistan relations have been tense in recent years. The two countries fought in border clashes in 2021 and 2022. Refugees and antigovernment fighters in Tajikistan have crossed into Kyrgyzstan several times, even taking hostages.

History 
Kyrgyzstan attempted to assist in brokering an agreement between contesting Tajik forces in October 1992 but without success. Askar Akayev later joined presidents Islam Karimov and Nursultan Nazarbayev in sending a joint intervention force to support Tajikistan's president Emomalii Rahmon against insurgents, but the Kyrgyzstani parliament delayed the mission of its small contingent for several months until late spring 1993. In mid-1995, Kyrgyzstani forces had the responsibility of sealing a small portion of the Tajikistan border near Panj from Tajik rebel forces.

The greater risk to Kyrgyzstan from Tajikistan is the general destabilization that the protracted civil war has brought to the region. In particular, the Khorog-Osh road, the so-called "highway above the clouds", has become a major conduit of contraband of all sorts, including weapons and drugs. A meeting of the heads of the state security agencies of Tajikistan, Kyrgyzstan, Kazakhstan, and Uzbekistan, held in Osh in the spring of 1995, also drew the conclusion that ethnic, social, and economic conditions in Osh were increasingly similar to those in Tajikistan in the late 1980s, thus recognizing the contagion of Tajikistan's instability.

Beginning on April 28, 2021, a border clash between the two countries broke out, resulting in the death of more than 40 people and displacing 30,000 on the Kyrgyz side. Border clashes erupted again in September 14, 2022, causing at least 94 deaths.

State visits

Presidential visits from Tajikistan to Kyrgyzstan 
 Emomali Rahmon (January 1993, May 1998, September 2007 and May 2013)

Presidential visits from Kyrgyzstan to Tajikistan 
 Askar Akaev (July 1996 and May 2004) 
 Kurmanbek Bakiyev (May 2008)
 Roza Otunbayeva (November 2010)
 Sooronbay Jeenbekov (February 2018)
 Sadyr Japarov (June 2021)

See also

 Kyrgyzstan–Tajikistan border
 Foreign relations of Kyrgyzstan
 Foreign relations of Tajikistan

References 

 
Tajikistan
Bilateral relations of Tajikistan